Philip Maxwell Ruddock  (born 12 March 1943 in Canberra) is an Australian politician and the current mayor of Hornsby Shire.  

Ruddock is a member of the Liberal Party of Australia and currently the state president of the party's New South Wales division. 

He is a Vice Chair of the Global Panel Foundation Australasia and Sir Donald Charles McKinnon  is Chair.

Ruddock was previously a Liberal member of the House of Representatives from 1973 to 2016. First elected in a 1973 by-election, by the time of his retirement he was the last parliamentary survivor of the Whitlam and Fraser Governments. He was both the Father of the House and the Father of the Parliament from 1998 to retirement.

He is the second longest-serving parliamentarian in the history of the Australian Parliament; only Billy Hughes has served longer. Ruddock served continuously in the ministry during the Howard Government, as Minister for Immigration and Multicultural Affairs from 1996 to 2001 (promoted to the federal Cabinet in 2003), Minister for Immigration and Multicultural and Indigenous Affairs from 2001 to 2003, and Attorney-General from 2003–2007.

Early life and education
Philip Ruddock is the son of Emmie (née Chappell) and Maxwell "Max" Ruddock. Born in Canberra. His father was the Deputy Prices Commissioner working for the Commonwealth Government. The senior Ruddock was later a Liberal member of the New South Wales Legislative Assembly from 1962 to 1976 and a state minister in the Lewis and Willis governments.

Ruddock was educated at Barker College in the suburb of Hornsby before attending the University of Sydney, after which he practised as a solicitor. He was articled to the firm Berne, Murray and Tout and was promoted to partner.

From 1973–74, Ruddock was the federal president of the Young Liberals.

Political career

Early career; Member of Parliament and First term in Government 1973–1996

On 22 September 1973, Ruddock was elected to the House of Representatives at a by-election for the seat of Parramatta. He narrowly held it at the 1974 general election, but was returned with a large swing in 1975. A redistribution ahead of the 1977 election, however, split Parramatta almost in half. The western half retained the Parramatta name and became a marginal Labor seat anchored in heavily pro-Labor west Sydney. The eastern half, including most of the old Parramatta's Liberal-friendly areas, became the comfortably safe Liberal seat of Dundas. Ruddock transferred to Dundas, and held it without serious difficulty until its abolition in 1993. Ruddock then transferred to the equally safe seat of Berowra, a seat he held for the remainder of his federal political career.

Shadow Minister (1983–1996)

Ruddock was a member of the Opposition Shadow Ministry from 1983 to 1985 and from 1989 to 1996. In the 1980s and early 1990s, he was an active member of the parliamentary group of Amnesty International. In 2000, Ruddock was disavowed by Amnesty International due to the treatment of refugees by the Howard Government and asked not to wear his Amnesty International badge while performing ministerial duties.

While Ruddock was still a backbencher, the Leader of the Opposition, John Howard, commented that he believed the rate of Asian immigration was too high. The Hawke Labor government sought to introduced a bill to Parliament to ensure that immigration did not discriminate on the basis of race. Ruddock along with fellow Liberals Steele Hall and Ian Macphee crossed the floor to support the Labor motion. In 1989, following Andrew Peacock's ascension to the leadership, Ruddock became Shadow Minister for Immigration and proposed a settlement scheme for Australia's far north.

Cabinet Minister, Second term in Government (1996–2007)

Minister for Immigration
Following the Coalition's rise to government at the 1996 election, Ruddock was appointed Minister for Immigration and Multicultural Affairs. Following the 1998 election, Ruddock was promoted to Cabinet. In this role, he administered the Department of Immigration and Multicultural Affairs and presided over the Howard government's policies on asylum seekers. During his time in office, the previous Keating Labor Government's practice of mandatory detention of asylum seekers was continued and extended. In October 1999, the Australian government introduced Temporary Protection Visas for persons who applied for refugee status after making an unauthorised arrival in Australia, and was the main type of visa issued to refugees when released from Australian immigration detention facilities. Many Afghan and Iraqi refugees who are not Australian citizens were affected by this policy.

Minister for Indigenous Affairs
Ruddock was appointed to the role of Minister for Indigenous Affairs, in 2001. By 2001 he had become a high-profile figure enjoying considerable support within the Liberal Party, while being strongly opposed by left-wing activists and some human rights advocates. 

Ruddock's "Pacific Solution" – which prevented asylum seekers receiving legal access – was condemned by Human Rights Watch as contravening international law, as being a human rights violation: Oxfam and the UNHCR (United Nations refugee agency) agreed with this viewpoint.

Ruddock's decisions were highly controversial and led to Amnesty International's public attempt to distance the organisation from him by asking him to remove his lapel badge.
 
In 2003, Ruddock was accused by the Labor immigration spokesperson, Julia Gillard, of personally intervening to give a Filipino with a criminal record, Dante Tan, favourable treatment in exchange for donations to the Liberal Party. Ruddock denied that there was a connection between the donations and his actions, and noted that the donation had been properly declared. In 2004, an Australian Federal Police investigation cleared Ruddock of any wrongdoing, and a Senate inquiry, composed of a majority of Labor members, found that "there was no way to determine whether Mr Ruddock was influenced by money to grant visas."

Attorney-General
In 2003, Ruddock was Attorney-General in a cabinet reshuffle. On 27 May 2004, Ruddock introduced the Marriage Legislation Amendment Bill to prevent any possible court rulings allowing same-sex marriages or civil unions.

Ruddock defended a decision to deny a gay veteran's partner a spousal pension, despite their 38-year same-sex relationship. 

The UN Human Rights Commission found the Australian government in violation of equality and privacy rights under the International Covenant of Civil and Political Rights, but Ruddock insisted the government was not bound by the ruling.

In May 2006, Ruddock blocked a gay Australian man from marrying in Europe. 

Ruddock refused to grant a gay man living in the Netherlands a 'Certificate of No Impediment to Marriage' document required by some European countries before marriage, to prove foreigners are in fact single. Under Ruddock's instructions, no such documents were to be released to gay and lesbians individuals intending to marry overseas.

In July 2007, he remarked that Australia needs to improve its legislation to deal with pro-terrorist literature and media. "People who may be susceptible to carrying out a terrorist act ought not to be instructed in how to do it, how to use household products to produce a bomb, or be encouraged to think about violent jihad and taking their own life", he said.

In 2007 Ruddock and the New South Wales Right to Life Association complained to the Australian Classification Board about the sale in Australia of The Peaceful Pill Handbook by Philip Nitschke and Fiona Stewart. The book provides information on assisted death and voluntary euthanasia. The complaint resulted in the book's banning from sale in Australia. Nitschke commented that "No other country in the world ... has gone down this path - Australia stands alone" and that the Ruddock's action represented a "significant erosion to the free speech principle and it's extremely disappointing".

Opposition, 2007–2013

Following the November 2007 election, Ruddock did not seek a shadow cabinet role and returned to the backbench.

He returned to the frontbench as Shadow Cabinet Secretary after Tony Abbott captured the Opposition leadership in December 2009. The Coalition was returned to government in 2013.

Third term in government and retirement, 2013–2016

Ruddock was named the Chief Government Whip in the House of Representatives in the Abbott Government, which took office on 18 September 2013. 

Ruddock was replaced as Chief Government Whip by Queensland MP Scott Buchholz on 13 February 2015.

On 27 May 2015, Ruddock was appointed to the new office of Special Envoy for Citizenship and Community Engagement. The office was created in the wake of controversial proposals by the government to strip sole Australian nationals of their citizenship.

On 8 February 2016, Ruddock announced that he would not contest the next federal election and would be retiring from politics.

On the 8 February 2016, Foreign Minister Julie Bishop announced that Ruddock would be appointed Australia's first special envoy for human rights.

Post parliamentary career
Ruddock has served as the Special Envoy for Human Rights since 8 February 2016. During this period he has represented Australia abroad for the promotion and protections of Human Rights.

In August 2017, Ruddock announced his candidacy for Mayor of Hornsby Shire and was elected on 9 September 2017.

In November 2017, Ruddock accepted an invitation from the Prime Minister, Malcolm Turnbull, to chair a review of religious freedoms in Australia in light of the Australian Marriage Law Postal Survey and the introduction into federal parliament a private member's bill to enact the Marriage Amendment (Definition and Religious Freedoms) Act 2017.

In February 2018, Ruddock was elected as the state president of the Liberal Party NSW Division.

Personal life
Ruddock is married to Heather. They have two children, Kirstie and Caitlin. 

Ruddock's daughters found it difficult to reconcile their father's hard line on immigration with the values of compassion they were raised with.

References

External links

Australian Story transcript

1943 births
Abbott Government
Attorneys-General of Australia
Australian Anglicans
Australian solicitors
Government ministers of Australia
Howard Government
Liberal Party of Australia members of the Parliament of Australia
Living people
Members of the Cabinet of Australia
Members of the Australian House of Representatives
Members of the Australian House of Representatives for Berowra
Members of the Australian House of Representatives for Dundas
Members of the Australian House of Representatives for Parramatta'
Officers of the Order of Australia
People educated at Barker College
People from Canberra
People from the North Shore, Sydney
Sydney Law School alumni
21st-century Australian politicians
20th-century Australian politicians
Shire Presidents and Mayors of Hornsby